The Music Master may refer to:
 The Music Master (play), a 1904 play by Charles Klein
 The Music Master (1908 film), an American short silent drama film
 The Music Master (1927 film), an American silent drama film, adapted from the play
 The Music Master (1945 film), a Canadian drama film also known in French as Le Père Chopin